Pedro Massana Calvet (19 December 1923 – 28 July 1991) was a Spanish rower who competed in the 1952 Summer Olympics. He was born in Barcelona.

References

External links
 

1923 births
1991 deaths
Spanish male rowers
Olympic rowers of Spain
Rowers at the 1952 Summer Olympics
Rowers from Barcelona
European Rowing Championships medalists